Malu Mare is a commune in Dolj County, Oltenia, Romania with a population of 3,124 people. It is composed of two villages, Malu Mare and Preajba. It also included Ghindeni village until 2004, when it was split off to form a separate commune.

References

Communes in Dolj County
Localities in Oltenia